The Kallikaks is an American sitcom television series starring David Huddleston which centers around a family from Appalachia that moves to California to run a decrepit gasoline station. The show aired from August 3 to August 31, 1977 on NBC.

Cast
David Huddleston as Jasper T. "J. T." Kallikak
Edie McClurg as Venus Kallikak
Bonnie Ebsen as Bobbi Lou Kallikak
Patrick J. Petersen as Junior Kallikak
Peter Palmer as Oscar Heinz

Synopsis

Jasper T. "J. T." Kallikak is a coal miner from Appalachia. He inherits a run-down two-pump gasoline station in the fictional town of Nowhere, California. Thinking that as his own boss he will have a better life, he moves his impoverished family — his big-hearted and overly affectionate wife Venus, his status-seeking teenage daughter Bobbie Lou, and his 10-year-old son Junior (who is a smarter version of his father, prone to using big words, and a genius with mechanical things) — from West Virginia to California to run the gas station, selling no-name gasoline.

J. T.s boarder and only employee there is Oscar Heinz, a German immigrant who can barely speak English and as a result often gets things mixed up. Bobbi Lou gets a job at a nearby fried chicken stand.

J. T. is conniving, greedy, and inclined toward get-rich-quick schemes; he boasts of never having paid taxes, saying that there is no need to as long as there are fools who do pay their taxes. He and his family are always trying to — in the words of the shows theme song — "beat the system;" for example, they try to apply for welfare even though they are employed, and a social worker turns them away. The pumps at their gas station are rigged, and generally, their schemes to get ahead — which always seem to fail — involve conning and cheating someone else.

Production

Stanley Ralph Ross and Roger Price created The Kallikaks. Ross was its executive producer and George Yanok was its producer. Ross, Price, and Ron Kantor wrote the episodes.

Episode directors were Kantor, Bob LaHendro, and Dennis Steinmetz.

Ross wrote the shows theme song, "Beat the System," which Roy Clark performed for the opening credits. Tom Wells wrote other music used in the show.

Bonnie Ebsen was the daughter of Buddy Ebsen, who had starred from 1962 to 1971 in The Beverly Hillbillies.

Broadcast history

The Kallikaks premiered on August 3, 1977, and aired on NBC on Wednesdays at 9:30 p.m. throughout its brief run.  Broadcast during a time of the year when television viewership was low and criticized as an uninspired show with unlikeable characters, The Kallikaks never had much of a chance to succeed. Only five episodes were produced, the last one airing on August 31, 1977.

Trivia
The name of the family in the series title would seem to have come from The Kallikak Family: A Study in the Heredity of Feeble-Mindedness which was a 1912 book by the American psychologist and eugenicist Henry H. Goddard.

Episodes

References

External links

NBC original programming
1977 American television series debuts
1977 American television series endings
1970s American sitcoms
English-language television shows
Television series about dysfunctional families
Television shows set in California